Surni or Sureni or Soorenie, also rendered as Surini and Surniyeh, may refer to:
 Surni-ye Olya
 Surni-ye Sofla